Gwynne Building is a registered historic building in Cincinnati, Ohio, listed in the National Register on August 3, 1979.

History
The almost 125,000-square-foot twelve-story Gwynne Building was completed in 1914.  The building was designed by Ernest Flagg, who also designed the Singer Building in New York and the Corcoran Gallery of Art in Washington, DC.

The structure was commissioned by Flagg's cousin, Alice Gwynne Vanderbilt, who was the wife of Cornelius Vanderbilt II.   Alice and Ernest were first cousins as Alice's mother, Rachel Moore Flagg, was the sister of Flagg's father, Jared Bradley Flagg.  Alice named the Gwynne Building in honor of her father, Abraham Evan Gwynne, a prominent Cincinnati lawyer and Judge.  Her paternal grandfather, Major David Gwynne, was a real estate broker in Cincinnati, whose family was among the early settlers of Cincinnati, and Alice was said to be a distant relative of the Longworth family.  She inherited the property at 6th and Main St. and her brother took the corner of 4th and Main St.

The tallest section, the tower, is 13 stories. The Beaux-Arts style building is made of steel and concrete the exterior is rendered in Indiana limestone, brick and granite.  Originally the building was considered fireproof as there was "no wood of any description being used," even the floors were buffed cement with the hall floors mosaics.  The corners of the building are adorned with ox heads.

In addition to the 1913 building, the east building was built in 1916, and the north building was built in 1939.

Tenants
From 1935 until 1956, the office building housed the headquarters of Procter & Gamble (P&G). The P&G World Headquarters are now located in twin towers several blocks to the east.

In 1992, the building was purchased by a group of tenants and investors from EQ Office, which was owned by Chicago billionaire real estate investor Sam Zell, founder and chairman of Equity International.  The purchase was followed by an about $1,000,000 in renovations.

In July 2014, the building, which was then 88% occupied, was offered for sale.  The tenants included Southwest Ohio Regional Transit Authority, Sound Images (later renamed Gwynne Sound), the Charles H. Dater Foundation and the Greater Cincinnati & Northern Kentucky Film Commission. It was purchased by an investment group led by Patrick Gates.

References

External links

Gwynne Building documentation from the University of Cincinnati College of Design, Architecture, Art, and Planning.

Beaux-Arts architecture in Ohio
Office buildings completed in 1913
National Register of Historic Places in Cincinnati
Office buildings in Cincinnati
1913 establishments in Ohio